The 2020 World Junior Ice Hockey Championship Division I consisted of two tiered groups of six teams each: the second-tier Division I A and the third-tier Division I B. For each tier's tournament, the team which placed first was promoted to the next highest division, while the team which placed last was relegated to a lower division.

To be eligible as a junior player in these tournaments, a player couldn't be born earlier than 2000.

Division I A

The Division I A tournament was played in Minsk, Belarus, from 9 to 15 December 2019.

Participants

Match officials
Four referees and 7 linesmen were selected for the tournament.

Referees
 Michał Baca
 Andrea Moschen
 Alexey Roshchyn
 Marcus Wannerstedt

Linesmen
 Pavel Badyl
 Nicola Basso
 Thomas Caillot
 Dario Fuchs
 Lukáš Kacej
 Mikita Paliakou
 Toivo Tilku

Standings

Results
All times are local (UTC+3).

Statistics

Top 10 scorers

GP = Games played; G = Goals; A = Assists; Pts = Points; +/− = Plus-minus; PIM = Penalties In Minutes
Source: IIHF.com

Goaltending leaders
(minimum 40% team's total ice time)

TOI = Time On Ice (minutes:seconds); GA = Goals against; GAA = Goals against average; Sv% = Save percentage; SO = Shutouts
Source: IIHF.com

Best Players Selected by the Directorate
 Goaltender:  Jānis Voris
 Defenceman:  Ilya Solovyov
 Forward:  Benjamin Baumgartner

Source: IIHF.com

Division I B

The Division I B tournament was played in Kyiv, Ukraine, from 12 to 18 December 2019.

Participants

Match officials
4 referees and 7 linesmen were selected for the tournament.

Referees
 Miha Bulovec
 Richard Magnusson
 Andrew Miller
 Rasmus Toppel

Linesmen
 Roman Kaderli
 Ilya Khohlov
 Ilia Kisil
 Artem Korepanov
 Andreas Weise Krøyer
 Patrick Laguzov
 Nazar Slezov

Standings

Results
All times are local (UTC+2).

Statistics

Top 10 scorers

GP = Games played; G = Goals; A = Assists; Pts = Points; +/− = Plus-minus; PIM = Penalties In Minutes
Source: IIHF.com

Goaltending leaders
(minimum 40% team's total ice time)

TOI = Time On Ice (minutes:seconds); GA = Goals against; GAA = Goals against average; Sv% = Save percentage; SO = Shutouts
Source: IIHF.com

Best Players Selected by the Directorate
 Goaltender:  Artur Ohandzhanyan
 Defenceman:  Dávid Pokornyi
 Forward:  Pierrick Dubé

Source: IIHF.com

References

External links
Division I A
Division I B

I
World Junior Ice Hockey Championships – Division I
International ice hockey competitions hosted by Belarus
International ice hockey competitions hosted by Ukraine
2019–20 in Belarusian ice hockey
2019–20 in Ukrainian ice hockey
Sports competitions in Minsk
Sports competitions in Kyiv
IIHF